Abralia steindachneri is a species of enoploteuthid cephalopod found in Indo-Pacific waters, from east Africa to the Ryukyu Islands of Japan and northern Australia.

References

Abralia
Molluscs described in 1912